The Ministry of Aquatic and Air Transport, "Ministry of the Popular Power of Aquatic and Air Transport", MPPTAA or MTAA) is a ministry of the Government of Venezuela. Its head office is on the 12th floor of the Torre Pequiven in Chacao Municipality, Caracas.

The ministry includes the Directorate General for the Prevention and Investigation of Aeronautical Accidents (DGPIAA), which investigates air accidents and incidents, and the Directorate General for the Prevention and Investigation of Aquatic Accidents, which investigates marine accidents and incidents.

The ministry also includes Conviasa and Simón Bolívar International Airport.

History
Previously the National Institute of Civil Aviation served as the civil aviation agency, and the Civil Aviation Accident Investigation Board investigated air accidents and incidents.

In November 2011 Hugo Chávez, President of Venezuela, announced that the Ministry of Transport and Communications would be divided into two ministries, the MPPTAA and the Ministry of Ground Transport.

References

Further reading
 Civil aviation law (Archive)

External links
 Ministry of Aquatic and Air Transport 

Aquatic and Air Transport
Aviation organizations based in Venezuela
Venezuela, Aquatic and Air Transport
Venezuela
Venezuela
Venezuela, Aquatic and Air Transport
2011 establishments in Venezuela
Civil aviation in Venezuela